Exiguobacterium enclense is a Gram-positive bacterium from the genus of Exiguobacterium which has been isolated from marine sediments from the Chorão island.

References

Bacillaceae
Bacteria described in 2015